Gandul is one of the forty subbarrios of Santurce, San Juan, Puerto Rico.

Demographics
In 2000, Gandul had a population of 2035.

In 2010, Gandul had a population of 1,507 and a population density of 21,528.6 persons per square mile.

See also 
 
 List of communities in Puerto Rico

References

Santurce, San Juan, Puerto Rico
Municipality of San Juan